Hermas is a masculine given name. Notable people with the name include:

 Hermas of Dalmatia (1st century), one of the Seventy Disciples, feast day April 8
 Hermas of Philippopolis (1st century), one of the Seventy Disciples, feast day May 31
 Hermas (freedman) (2nd century), Christian mystic
 Hermas Deslauriers (1879–1941), Canadian physician

It is also a plant genus:
 Hermas (plant), a genus in the carrot family Apiaceae

See also
 Joseph-Hermas
 Saint-Hermas
 Hermes of Philippopolis

Masculine given names